Hydnotrya tulasnei is a species of fungus belonging to the family Discinaceae.

It is native to Europe and Northern America, Japan.

References

Discinaceae